Yellow stickers are a method of alerting shoppers to food which has been reduced in price because it is approaching its sell by date.

Yellow stickers are used by most UK supermarket chains, including Asda, Co-op, Marks and Spencer, Sainsbury's, Tesco and Waitrose.

They are also found elsewhere in the world, such as in Japan.

References

Sales and clearances
Food safety
Packaging
Food retailing
Product expiration